Direct from the Backstreet is the debut album by East Palo Alto rap duo Totally Insane. It was released on April 16, 1992 for In-a-Minute Records and was produced by TC Productions and the group's two members, Mac-10 and Ad Kapone.

Track listing
"Intro"- :55  
"What Ya Know"- 6:03  
"Kiss No Ass"- 2:54  
"No More Mr. Nice Guy"- 4:28  
"Heartless Mother Fucker"- 4:05  
"Mack Game"- 5:03  
"The Insane"- 4:11  
"Smoooth"- 3:39  
"-N- the Backstreets"- 6:48  
"I Can't Be Faded"- 4:28  
"I Don't Even Trip"- 3:10  
"Now Ya Understand"- 3:57  
"Outro"- 2:08

References

External links 

 Direct from the Backstreet on Discogs

1995 debut albums
Totally Insane albums